Brazos Valley Cavalry F.C. is an American soccer team based in Bryan, Texas, United States. Founded in 2017, the team plays in USL League Two, the fourth tier of the American Soccer Pyramid.

The team plays its home games at Edible Field, home to the Brazos Valley Bombers of the Texas Collegiate League. The team's colors are black, red, and white.

The team will serve as a hybrid affiliate of the Houston Dynamo of Major League Soccer. The hybrid affiliation, a first for the PDL, means that the Dynamo will be responsible for the soccer operations of the club, selecting players and coaching staff. The ownership group, Clutch Entertainment, will be responsible for operations and day-to-day management of the club.

History
In January 2017, the Houston Dynamo announced their official affiliation with a brand new PDL team that would start play in summer in College Station/Bryan, Texas. They will be owned by the Clutch Entertainment Group who already own summer collegiate baseball team, Brazos Valley Bombers.

On January 16, 2017, James Clarkson was announced as the head coach for the inaugural season. Clarkson had been with the Houston Dynamo for 10 years as the Academy Director and oversaw the creation and development of that program.

In February 2017, Brazos Valley Cavalry F.C. was announced as the team's name in an online vote. The team's crest and colors were also announced with the crest having two stars representing the two largest communities in the Brazos Valley “Bryan” & “College Station."

Year by year

Honors
 USL PDL Mid South Division Champions 2018
 USL League Two Mid South Division Champions 2019
 USL League Two Lone Star Division Champions 2022

Players and staff

Current roster
As of June 2019.

Staff
 TBD – Head Coach
 TBD – General Manager

Notable players
This list of notable players comprises players who have gone on to play professional soccer after playing for the team in the Premier Development League, or those who previously played professionally before joining the team.

  Wilmer Cabrera Jr.
  Zach Jackson
  Talen Maples
  Harry Swartz 
  Carlos Viveros

References

External links
 

Association football clubs established in 2017
USL League Two teams
Houston Dynamo FC
2017 establishments in Texas
Soccer clubs in Texas
Reserve soccer teams in the United States
Brazos County, Texas